Blue Ridge Township may refer to:
Blue Ridge Township, Howard County, Arkansas, in Howard County, Arkansas
Blue Ridge Township, Piatt County, Illinois
Blue Ridge Township, Henderson County, North Carolina, in Henderson County, North Carolina
Blue Ridge Township, Watauga County, North Carolina, in Watauga County, North Carolina
Blue Ridge Township, Williams County, North Dakota, in Williams County, North Dakota

Township name disambiguation pages